Patrick Woods (born 1967) is a former Australian track and field athlete, winner of the 1990 senior 3000 metres steeplechase title, as well as several Australian junior titles in the 1980s. He also represented Australia in the 2000 metre steeple chase at the 1986 World Junior Championships in Athletics.

See also
List of Australian athletics champions (men)

References
 Athletics Australia Handbook of Records and Results 1985-1995.

1967 births
Living people
Sportspeople from Wollongong
Australian male long-distance runners
Australian male steeplechase runners